Hawk's Tor is an elongated hill,  high and running from WSW to ENE, on Bodmin Moor in the county of Cornwall, England, UK. It stands opposite the village of North Hill across the valley of the River Lynher.

There is another Hawk's Tor (307 m) on Bodmin Moor, further west, near the village of Blisland.

References 

Hills of Cornwall
Bodmin Moor